Soddì is a comune (municipality) in the Province of Oristano in the Italian region Sardinia, located about  north of Cagliari and about  northeast of Oristano.

Soddì borders the following municipalities: Aidomaggiore, Boroneddu, Ghilarza.

Demographic evolution

References

Cities and towns in Sardinia